Wojcieszyce may refer to the following places in Poland:
Wojcieszyce, Lower Silesian Voivodeship (south-west Poland)
Wojcieszyce, Świętokrzyskie Voivodeship (south-central Poland)
Wojcieszyce, Lubusz Voivodeship (west Poland)